Napier Port is in Napier, New Zealand, on Hawke Bay. It is the North Island's second largest export port by tonnage, and is owned by Napier Port Holdings Limited.

The port is connected to the rail network via the Napier Port Branch (Ahuriri Branch).

It hosts dozens of cruise ship visits each year. On 16 February 2008 it was visited by the longest vessel it had received at the time, the MS Queen Victoria cruise ship belonging to Cunard. On December 15, 2014, the 138,194 tonne MS Voyager of the Seas visited the port, which was the joint 21st largest passenger ship at the time, and the largest to ever visit. On 5 January 2017, the port hosted the world's third largest cruise ship (at the time), the 168,666 tonne MS Ovation of the Seas.

Hastings District, as one of the largest apple, pear and stone fruit producing areas in New Zealand has an important relationship with the Napier Port. It has also become an important grape growing and wine production area with the fruit passing from the growers around Metropolitan Hastings and then to Napier for exporting. Napier is an important service centre for the agriculture and pastoral output of the predominantly rural Hastings District. The port handled 157,700 containers (roughly 9% of all containers handled by New Zealand ports) in the 2015 calendar year, behind the ports of Auckland, Tauranga and Lyttelton.

A public poll was held in January 1885 on the decision to move the port from the Ahuriri spit to its current location, beneath Bluff Hill. The breakwater harbor was completed in 1886, and the container depot was established in 1994. A new wharf is currently being planned (as of early 2016) to handle projected volume growth and larger vessels, and will be the port's largest ever single investment, at $50 million NZD. This will help to maintain the port's position as the fourth-largest container terminal in the country, processing more containers than Wellington, Nelson and New Plymouth combined.

References

External links

Ahuriri website (Port Ahuriri, Napier's main port before relocation)
Cyclopedia of NZ: Napier Harbour Board history 1875-1908, biographies and photos

Buildings and structures in Napier, New Zealand
Napier
Napier, Port